Norway national rugby union team (Norwegian: Norges nasjonale rugbyunionsteam) represents Norway in men's international rugby union competitions, It's a member of the Rugby Europe and plays in Rugby Europe's Conference 2- North Championship.

Norway's once-captain and a rare professional player is Erik Lund, who played until 2010 at lock for Leeds Carnegie. Erik is the brother of England international Magnus Lund, and joined him at Biarritz Olympique in France from autumn 2010. Lund had been unavailable to play for Norway since 2006, however played for Norway in May 2010 against Slovenia.

The national side is ranked 100th in the world (as of 8 August 2022).

Current squad
Norway's Training Squad for the 2016/17 Rugby Europe Conference 2- North Championship. Norway lost to Hungary; 41-7 (32-0), on 22 April in Eztergom.  They defeated Estonia, 43-16 (17-13) on 6 May, in Oslo.

Overall Record
Below is table of the representative rugby matches played by a Norway national XV at test level up until 23 October 2021.

References

External links 
 Norges Rugbyforbund - Official Site
 IRB Page
 Norway on rugbydata.com

Teams in European Nations Cup (rugby union)
European national rugby union teams
Rugby union in Norway
Rugby Union